Gmina Kunice (German: Kunitz Kreis)is a rural gmina (administrative district) in Legnica County, Lower Silesian Voivodeship, in south-western Poland.

Neighbouring gminas
Gmina Kunice is bordered by the town of Legnica and the gminas of Legnickie Pole, Lubin, Miłkowice, Prochowice and Ruja.

Villages
The gmina contains the villages of Bieniowice, Golanka Górna, Grzybiany, Jaśkowice Legnickie, Kunice, Miłogostowice, Pątnów Legnicki, Piotrówek, Rosochata, Spalona, Szczytniki Małe, Szczytniki nad Kaczawą and Ziemnice.

Twin towns – sister cities

Gmina Kunice is twinned with:
 Brühl, Germany

References

Kunice
Legnica County